Dun Nosebridge is an Iron Age fort southeast of Bridgend, Islay, Scotland. The fort is on the right bank of the River Laggan.

The name's origin is probably a mixture of Scottish Gaelic and Old Norse: Dun in the former language means "fort" and knaus-borg in the latter means "fort on the crag". Another possibility is the Norse hnaus-bog meaning "turf fort".

Notes

References
 Newton, Norman (1995) Islay, Devon: David & Charles PLC.

External links

Islay
Iron Age sites in Scotland
Scheduled monuments in Scotland